Stephen Wallace Dorsey (1842–1916) was a U.S. Senator from Arkansas from 1873 to 1879. Senator Dorsey may also refer to:

John H. Dorsey (1937–2018), New Jersey State Senate
Samuel Worthington Dorsey (1811–1875), Louisiana State Senate
Yvonne Dorsey-Colomb (born 1952), Louisiana State Senate